RKP can stand for:

Swedish People's Party (Finland)
Swedish National Bureau of Investigation, abbreviated RKP
RKP (b), Russian Communist Party (bolsheviks). In Russian, Российская Коммунистическая Партия (большевиков), РКП(б))
Native Polish Church - Polish acronym for the Slavic pagan religious association
R. K. Padmanabha, Indian Carnatic music vocalist known by his initials RKP